Arthur Powell may refer to:

 Arthur E. Powell (1882–1969), Theosophist
 Arthur Ted Powell (born 1947), British-born advertising art director, artist and printmaker
 Baden Powell (malacologist) (Arthur William Baden Powell, 1901–1987), New Zealand malacologist, naturalist and palaeontologist